Ethan Samuel Slater (born June 2, 1992) is an American actor, singer, writer, and composer, best known for his role as SpongeBob SquarePants in the musical of the same name, for which he received a Tony Award nomination and won a Drama Desk Award.

Early life and education
Slater grew up in Silver Spring, Maryland, with two older sisters, Sara Slater and Tamara Slater. His mother died when he was 7. His father, Jay Slater, is remarried, and Slater has two step-brothers. His family is Jewish. He attended Charles E. Smith Jewish Day School and Georgetown Day School. He attended Vassar College in Poughkeepsie, New York.

Personal life

In 2012, Slater began dating his former high school classmate Lilly Jay. In 2018, the two were married. They had their first child, a son, in 2022.

Works

Film

Television

Web

Theatre

Discography

Cast recordings

Solo recordings

Awards and nominations

References

External links
 
 
 

Living people
1992 births
Male actors from New York City
Male actors from Washington, D.C.
American male musical theatre actors
American male stage actors
Vassar College alumni
Jewish American male actors
Georgetown Day School alumni
Theatre World Award winners
Jewish singers
21st-century American Jews